"Proud" is the debut solo single by M People singer Heather Small, released on 8 May 2000. It was co-written with and produced by Peter-John Vettese, and is the title track of her debut album Proud. The song peaked at number 16 on the UK Singles Chart.

In popular culture
In 2000, the song was used in the closing montage of the BBC's coverage of the 2000 Summer Olympics. Five years later, it was adopted as the official theme for the London 2012 Olympic bid, and was featured in a widely seen promotional video for the bid. Re-released in honour of this, and due to the fact a new M People greatest hits titled Ultimate Collection, which also included two of Small's solo songs, was released the same year, the song returned to the UK Singles Chart peaking at number 33 and remaining in the Top 75 for two more weeks. The song was also re-released on The Biggest Loser soundtrack in 2006. It peaked at number 34.

The song was also referenced and used in the BBC show Miranda. One of the show's characters, Stevie Sutton, frequently sang part of the chorus using a cardboard cutout of Small, part of the song was also used at the end of an episode in series 3, and Small appeared in the show's finale, the second of two specials released in 2014/2015.

The song was used in the BBC soap opera EastEnders in 2019 for Gay pride

Track listing

Charts

Certifications

References

2000 songs
2000 debut singles
Arista Records singles
Song recordings produced by Peter-John Vettese
Songs written by Peter-John Vettese